Maillingerstraße is an U-Bahn station in Munich on the U1, opened on 28 May 1983.

See also
Maillingerstraße

References

External links

Munich U-Bahn stations
Railway stations in Germany opened in 1983
Buildings and structures completed in 1983
1983 establishments in West Germany